Universo is the name of a comic book character

Universo may also refer to:
 Universo BRB
 Universo Online
 El Universo, newspaper
 Universo (Axel album)
 Universo (TV network), an American cable network

See also
 Universo Latino
 Universe (disambiguation)